214th Division or 214th Infantry Division may refer to:

 214th Division (People's Republic of China)
 214th Infantry Division (Wehrmacht)
 214th Coastal Division (Italy)
 214th Division (Imperial Japanese Army)